Dexterity refers to fine motor skills in using one's hands.

Dexterity may also refer to:

 Dexterity (programming language), used to customize Microsoft Dynamics GP software
 "Dexterity" (song), a 1947 bebop standard written by Charlie Parker
 Dexterity (Jo Jo Zep & The Falcons album), 1981
 Dexterity (George Shearing album), 1988
 Dexterity Island, Nunavut, Canada
 The dexterity attribute (ability score) of characters in various games, such as Dungeons and Dragons
 Dexterity (video game), a 1990 video game for the Nintendo Game Boy
 Manuel and Manuella Dexterity, siblings from the Xombi comics
 Operation Dexterity, a military operation

See also
 Dextrous (disambiguation)
 Dextrose